This is a List of Old Trinitarians, they being notable alumni - known as "Old Trinitarians" of the Anglican Church school, Trinity Grammar School, Sydney in Summer Hill, New South Wales, Australia.

Academic
Timothy Argall – Headmaster of Mentone Grammar School (2003–06), former Deputy Head of St Andrew's Cathedral School
Arthur Richard Godfrey-Smith – Professor Faculty of Law at the University of Technology, Sydney (1990–97); Director Coll. Law (1988–95), Head of the School of Legal Practice UTS and KCAE 1988–95
Trevor Langford-Smith – Emeritus Professor, University of Sydney
George Milton Cujes – Former Headmaster of Trinity Grammar School (1996-2017) and Former Headmaster of Brisbane Boys College (1990-1995)

Business
Timothy Dodds – Chief Executive of the Beston Parks Group
Andrew Bruce Gordon – Executive Chairman of the WIN Corporation Pty Ltd; Ranked 891 on The World's Billionaires 2007 (also attended Saltus Grammar School)
Rowen Kelly – former President of the Real Estate Institute of NSW; recipient of the Woodrow Weight Award for outstanding contribution to real estate agency practice
John Lamble AO – former chairman of Suncorp Metway
Edward Leaney – general manager of his family's company, Focus Uniforms and member of the so-called "Budgie 9" at the 2016 Malaysian Grand Prix
Christopher Harnett - Chief Customer Officer of 1-Stop Connections 
James Morrison Millar – Chief Executive Officer of Ernst & Young Australia
 David Warren AO – inventor of the flight data recorder (also attended Launceston Church Grammar School)

Entertainment, media and the arts
Nick Adams -  attended school as Nick Adamopoulos, US based author and commentator
 John Antill  – composer (also attended St Andrew's Cathedral School)
Gary Catalano – poet
 Jeremy Cordeaux – shock jock with Radio 5DN, Adelaide
 Benny Davis – musician, comedian and member of the comedy band The Axis of Awesome
 Marc Fennell – journalist and presenter of The Feed on SBS Two
 Daniel Furnari – Drummer for Polaris
 Daniel Goddard – actor; played title character in TV series Beastmaster
 Tristan Jepson – late actor and comedian, Big Bite on Seven Network
 Lonnie Lee – one of Australia's first rock'n'roll pop stars of radio, television and record
 Jordan Raskopoulos – actor, comedian, The Ronnie Johns Half Hour on Network Ten and member of the comedy band The Axis of Awesome
 Akmal Saleh - actor and comedian
 Angus Sampson – actor (also attended The Armidale School)
 Theodore Saidden- actor and creator of TV Show, Superwog
 Nathan Saidden- actor and creator of TV Show, Superwog
 Christopher Weekes – actor, screenwriter and director of Bitter & Twisted and "The Muppet Man" at Walt Disney Pictures.
 Peter Wherrett – celebrity motoring journalist
 Richard Wherrett   – late theatre director

Medicine and science
Peter Henry Carter – Health and Management Consultant; CEO of the Royal Australasian College of Surgeons (1989–99)
Richard Mark Fox AM – Director of the Research Council at St Vincent's Hospital, Melbourne; Acting Director of Royal Melbourne Hospital Research Foundation; Concurrent Prof. Nanjing University, China
Richard Maxwell (Dick) Gibson – pioneering physician
John Hugh Wilson Hogg OAM – Foundation Dean, Graduate School of Medicine, University of Wollongong; Stream Director of Surgery Northern Illawarra (2003–04)
Dr Daniel Nour- Young Australian of the Year 2022.

Military
Group Captain Clive Caldwell – the leading Australian Air ace of World War II (also attended Sydney Grammar School)
Second Lieutenant Dave Sabben, 12 Platoon, D Company, 6RAR. Vietnam Veteran and survivor of the Battle of Long Tan.
Rear-Adm. Rowan Carlisle Moffitt AM – Deputy Chief of Joint Operations, Headquarters Joint Operations Command, Sydney; Maritime Commander Australia (2004–05); Deputy Chief of Navy RAN (2002–04); Cmdt ADF Warfare Centre; Director General Naval Capability Management; CO HMAS Brisbane 1999, Chief Staff Officer Ops Maritime HQ; CO HMAS Newcastle
Commodore John Stavridis – CO HMAS Arunta; CO HMAS Anzac; Commissioning CO HMAS Hobart; CO HMAS Watson; Director General Littoral 
Commander Mark Taylor – CO HMAS Bendigo (FCPB 211); CO HMAS Gladstone (FCPB 216); Commissioning CO HMAS Wollongong;  CO HMAS Bundaberg CO HMAS Childers; XO HMAS HMAS_Sirius_(O_266); XO HMAS Warramunga; CO ADVs Cape Nelson, Cape Byron, and Cape Fourcroy; Commander Sea Training-North; Director Military Operations, Defence Network Operations Centre.

Politics, public service and the law
Gregory Keith Burton S.C. – arbitrator and mediator; Senior Counsel (NSW), Bar (1989–2004); Lecturer of Law at the Australian National University; Senior Advisor to the Federal Shadow Attorney-General Hon. John Spender QC MP
Crispin John Short Conroy – Australian Ambassador to Chile, Bolivia and Ecuador; Deputy High Commissioner of the Australian High Commission to Papua New Guinea (2003–05); Australian Ambassador to the Kingdom of Nepal
 Adrian Cruickshank – National Party Member for Murrumbidgee for four terms of office
 Justice Richard Edmonds – Federal Court of Australia
 Harvey Ford – Mayor (1965–66) and Alderman (1960–68) of Strathfield (Class of 1939)
 Vance Hughston S.C. – Senior Counsel, New South Wales
 Barrie Clive Hungerford – Acting Judge of the District Court of New South Wales; Judge of the Industrial Relations Commission NSW; Queen's Counsel 1988
 David Kelleher – convicted criminal
 Alan Bevly Kerrigan QC – barrister (second pupil enrolled at Trinity)
 David Henry Lloyd QC – Judge of the Land and Environment Court of New South Wales
 Jeremy Badgery Parker – Judge of the Supreme Court of New South Wales
 Ray Stevens (Australian politician)|Ray Stevens – Member for Robina in the Legislative Assembly of Queensland
 David Davies (judge)|David Davies – Judge of the Supreme Court of New South Wales

Religion
Bernard Russell Buckland – Regional Secretary of the Western Australia Bush Church Aid Society (1997–2000); Rector of Newman, Western Australia (1995–97); Assistant bishop of the Anglican Diocese of North West Australia 1988–97, Archdiocese of the Kimberley
David Charles Campbell Daintree – Rector of St John's College, University of Sydney; Principal of Jane Franklin Hall, University of Tasmania (1984–2002), Visiting Scholar at the University of Venice
Ernest Eric Hawkey – Bishop of Carpentaria, 1968–74
Richard Hurford – Anglican Bishop of Bathurst
Kenneth Herbert Short AO – Anglican Suffragan Bishop in the Sydney Diocese

Sport
 Luke Adams – race walker, Commonwealth Games 2002 and 2006 silver medalist
 Nathan Antunes – former Australian A1 Grand Prix rookie driver; international race car driver
 Fotunuupule Auelua – former ACT Brumbies Super Rugby player; played for French Clubs US Dax and RC Toulonnais in the European Top 14 Competition, and the NTT Communications Shining Arcs in Japan's Top League competition
 Steven Barnett – diver, Athens Olympics 2004 bronze medalist
 Blake Borgia – Sydney Kings guard
 Ryan Briscoe – Indycar
 Rohan Browning – current Australian sprinter, 2018 Commonwealth Games and 2020 Summer Olympics athlete
 Henry Clunies-Ross – Australia national rugby sevens team player
 Adam D'Apuzzo – midfielder for Newcastle Jets, A-League
 David D'Apuzzo – midfielder for Central Coast Mariners, A-League
 Jack Debreczeni – Former player for Melbourne Rebels & Chiefs (rugby union) Super Rugby Teams
Tane Edmed – Australia A national rugby union team and NSW Waratahs Fly Half
 Sam Fricker – Australian diver, competed in Olympic Games 2020 and Commonwealth Games 2022 Bronze Medallist
 Oliver Hoare – Australian middle distance athlete, Commonwealth Games 2022 Gold Medalist in 1500m and Olympic Games 2020 athlete
 Lachlan Ilias – South Sydney Rabbitohs NRL Halfback
 Col Irwin – professional wrestler, Australian and NSW Heavyweight Champion; founder of the Australian Professional Wrestling Academy
 Lars Kleppich – 2000 Summer Olympics sailor
 Alexander Kolesnikoff - Commonwealth Youth Games Gold Medallist 2017, World Junior Championships 2018
 Tom Lambert (rugby union) – Current NSW Waratahs prop and former Glasgow Warriors player
 James Leckie – Commonwealth games and Super Rugby rugby union referee; international rugby union touch judge
 Joel Milburn - Australian representative to the 2012 Olympics in Athletics; 5th fastest Australian all time
 Cameron Orr – Current Super Rugby Melbourne Rebels Prop and former Western Force and Gloucester Rugby player in the Aviva Premiership
Harrison Orr – Former Western Force Lock and Newcastle Falcons player in the Aviva Premiership
 Prashanth Sellathurai – Australian gymnast, national pommel horse champion since 2006; former world No.3 for pommel horse; commonly referred to as "Prince of the Pommel"; dual gold medalist and bronze medalist at the 2010 Commonwealth Games, silver medalist at the 2006 Commonwealth Games
 Glenn Singleman – base jumper; world record holder of the highest base jump in history
 Scott Sio – current Wallabies and ACT Brumbies Prop and former NSW Waratahs Super Rugby Union player; 
 Rory Sidey – former Melbourne Rebels, NSW Waratahs and Western Force Super Rugby union player
 Jonathan Cristopher Titmarsh Australian Representative at World Schools Athletics Championship, Gold Medalist
 Kenneth To – swimmer, Commonwealth Games 2008 bronze medalist and Youth Olympics 2009 gold medalist, 2010 Singapore Youth Olympics medalist, 2010 Dubai FINA World Championships (25m) finalist and 2012 FINA Swimming World Cup Champion
 Deke Zimmerman – marathon swimmer

See also
List of non-government schools in New South Wales
List of boarding schools
Combined Associated Schools

References

External links
 Trinity Grammar School
 Old Trinitarians' Union

Trinity Grammar School
Combined Associated Schools
Sydney-related lists
Lists of Australian men